Tomislav Volek, is a Czech musicologist who is best known for his research on the music of Wolfgang Amadeus Mozart.

Biography
Spending much of his career in Prague, Volek made a virtue of necessity by exploring the musical life of eighteenth-century Bohemia, with particular emphasis on Mozart’s activities in Prague. Meticulous archival research combined with a willingness to advance daring new hypotheses led to a series of pathbreaking articles, one of which, “Über den Ursprung von Mozarts Oper La clemenza di Tito” (Mozart-Jahrbuch, 1959), contributed to a fundamental reassessment of one of Mozart’s late operas, although some of his theories, especially the claim that Mozart began work on the opera much earlier than the summer of 1791, have been thoroughly refuted in English-language musicological literature. 

His work on Don Giovanni and its Bohemian context is also of crucial importance, as is his edition of Mozart documents, “The Mozartiana of Czech and Moravian Archives” (Prague, 1991).

Volek is President of the Czech Mozart Society and a member of the Czech Academy of Sciences.

External links

Works in Bibliography of the Czech Lands History (Historical Institute, Czech Academy of Sciences)
 Tomislav Volek and Elisabeth Johnson  (Uwe Johnson’s wife)

Notes 

Czech musicologists
Opera scholarship
Writers from Prague
Mozart scholars
1931 births
Living people